Upland Outlaws is a fantasy novel by Dave Duncan, following The Cutting Edge.

Plot
The sorcerer Zinixo has taken control of Hub, but life goes on as normal. As Zinixo and his Covin track down Rap and friends, Rap must get the word out to the other sorcerers about the plans to join together and destroy Zinixo. Having escaped across the Cenmere Sea, the group takes to ship and sets sail.

Characters
Ylo Yllipo - Signifier for Shandie and the XXth legion. Last of his line
Thaïle - Pixie in Thume
Shandie - Emshandar V. Imperor, although in exile. (This exile is unknown to the general populace, as Zinixo used Shandie's cousin and illusion magic to make it look like Shandie is still running the Impire.)
Sir Acopulo – Shandie's chief political advisor & tactician
Lord Umpily – Shandie's chief of protocol & spymaster
Hardgraa – Shandie's chief of bodyguard, currently guarding Eshiala
Kadie – Princess of Krasnegar. Twin of Gath
Inosolan – Queen of Krasnegar
Gath – Prince of Krasnegar. Twin of Kadie. Has the gift of Prescience
Rap – King of Krasnegar, ex-stableboy, ex-demigod, and sorcerer
Zinixo – Dwarven sorcerer secretly running the Impire
Eshiala – Princess and wife of Shandie
Eigaze - Impish countess, relative of Inosolan
Raspnex – Warlock and Warden of the north
Jarga - Jotunn sorceress, votary of Raspnex
Thinnal - Impish thief
Sagorn - Jotunn scholar
Andor - Impish libertine
Death Bird - Goblin King

Allusions/references to other works
The history of Rap, Insolan, and a younger Shandie are recounted in the series A Man of His Word by Dave Duncan.

Allusions/references to actual history
There are allusions to the Roman Empire, in the military structure and names of the Empire.

Release details
1993, USA, Del Rey, Pub date 1 May 1993, hardcover (First edition)
1993, USA, Del Rey, Pub date 1 October 1993, Paperback
1995, UK ?, Constable and Robinson, Pub date 20 June 1995, Paperback

References

1993 Canadian novels
Canadian fantasy novels
Del Rey books